Charles Roosevelt "Ted" Hawkins (October 29, 1900 – September 21, 1959) was an American politician, banker, and bank president from Brumley, Missouri, who served in the Missouri Senate.  He was the youngest son of  James M. Hawkins, a Union Army Civil War veteran who served as a state representative from 1881 until 1882.  Hawkins twice received the St. Louis Globe-Democrat award for meritorious public service as the senator most effective in debate.

References

1900 births
1959 deaths
Republican Party Missouri state senators
20th-century American politicians